Hendricks County Bridge Number 316, also known as Friendship Gardens Bridge, is a historic Pinned Warren Truss bridge located at Plainfield, Hendricks County, Indiana.  It was built in 1886, by the Morse Bridge Company of Youngstown, Ohio.  The single span bridge measures 170 feet long and spans White Lick Creek.

It was added to the National Register of Historic Places in 2003.

References

Road bridges on the National Register of Historic Places in Indiana
Bridges completed in 1886
National Register of Historic Places in Hendricks County, Indiana
Transportation buildings and structures in Hendricks County, Indiana
Warren truss bridges in the United States